The American Association for Physician Leadership is an educational organization focused on physicians who hold leadership and management positions. Its central offices are located in Tampa, Florida. Peter B. Angood is the chief executive officer of the 11,000-member organization.

History
The organization was founded in 1975 as the American Academy of Medical Directors (AAMD) in Alexandria, Virginia. The primary focus of the association's activities has been encouraging physicians to assume more active roles in the leadership and management of organizations in the health care industry and helping physicians acquire leadership and management skills. In 1982, AAMD moved its headquarters to Tampa. In 1980, the name was changed to the American College of Physician Executives (ACPE). In 2014 the organization rebranded and became the American Association for Physician Leadership with the stated goal of broadening the scope of programs, products and services. The association states that it strives to support the physician workforce across the entire career span, from medical students to those in later career stages. This also includes physicians in clinical roles, nonclinical administrative roles and those on nontraditional physician career paths.

Mission Statement 
"It is our core belief that all physicians are leaders, and as such are especially vital in determining and effecting better healthcare services delivery and patient outcomes. We therefore endeavor to prepare physicians in diverse disciplines to be influential and effective leaders in the improvement, delivery and management of healthcare services."

References 

Medical associations based in the United States
Medical and health organizations based in Florida